The following elections occurred in the year 1864.
 1864 Dalmatian parliamentary election

North America

United States
 United States House of Representatives elections in California, 1864
 1864 New York state election
 1864 and 1865 United States House of Representatives elections
 1864 United States presidential election
 1864 and 1865 United States Senate elections

See also
 :Category:1864 elections

1864
Elections